Quarter sawing or quartersawing is a woodworking process that produces quarter-sawn or quarter-cut boards in the rip cutting of logs into lumber. The resulting lumber can also be  called radially-sawn or simply quartered. There is widespread confusion between the terms rift sawn and quarter sawn with the terms defined both with opposite meanings and as synonyms.

Quarter-sawn boards have greater stability of form and size with less cupping, shrinkage across the width, shake and splitting, and other good qualities. In some woods such as oak, the grain produces a decorative effect which shows a prominent ray fleck, while sapele is likely to produce a ribbon figure.

Process

When boards are cut from a log, they are usually rip cut along the length (axis) of the log. This can be done in three ways: plain-sawing (most common, also known as flat-sawn, bastard-sawn, through and through, and tangent-sawn), quarter-sawing (less common), or rift sawing (rare).

In flat-sawing, the log is passed through the blade cutting off plank after plank without changing the orientation of the blade or log. The resulting planks have different annual ring orientations when viewed from the end. The relative angle that form the rings and the surface go from almost zero degrees in the external planks to almost ninety degrees at the core of the log.

Quarter sawing gets its name from the fact that the log is first quartered lengthwise, resulting in wedges with a right angle ending at approximately the center of the original log. Each quarter is then cut separately by tipping it up on its point and sawing boards successively along the axis. That results is boards with the annual rings mostly perpendicular to the faces. Quarter sawing yields boards with straight striped grain lines, greater stability than flatsawn wood, and a distinctive ray and fleck figure. It also yields narrower boards, because the log is first quartered, which is more wasteful.

Quartersawn boards can also be produced by cutting a board from one flat face of the quarter, flipping the wedge onto the other flat face to cut the next board, and so on.

The William Ritter Lumber Company (1890–1960), famous for its Appalachian oak flooring and other products, used a modified technique to reduce waste:  (1) bark and a few boards were removed from two opposite sides of the log; (2) the log was cut in half (possibly, four quarters); (3) each piece was placed on the flat side and "quartersawn" lumber was cut. (Note: no reference is made in this source to the notion of "flipping the wedge" as described in the preceding paragraph. Apparently, the cuts were made without "flipping.")

Quarter sawing is sometimes confused with the much less common "rift sawing."  In quartersawn wood, only the center board of the quarter-log is cut with the growth rings truly perpendicular to the surface of the board.  The smaller boards cut from either side have grain increasingly skewed.  Riftsawn wood has every board cut along a radius of the original log, so each board has a perpendicular grain, with the growth rings oriented at right angles to the surface of the board.  However, since this produces a great deal of waste (in the form of wedge-shaped scraps from between the boards) rift-sawing is very seldom used. Quartersawn wood is thus seen as an acceptable compromise between economical but less-stable flatsawn wood (which, especially in oak, will often display the distinct "cathedral window" grain) and the expensively-wasteful rift sawn wood, which has the straightest grain and thus the greatest stability.

Characteristics

Quartersawn boards have two advantages: they are more resistant against warping with changes in moisture and, while shrinkage can occur, it is less troublesome.

In high-end string instruments, the neck and fretboards can be made from quartersawn wood since they must remain stable throughout the life of the instrument, to keep the tone as invariable as possible.  In acoustic guitars, quartersawn wood is also often used for the sides which must be steam bent to produce compound curves. This is partly for structural reasons, but also for the aesthetics of highly figured timbers being highlighted when sawn this way. On high-end electric guitars and bass guitars quartersawn wood is often used as the base material for the neck of the guitar, since this makes for a stronger and straighter neck which aids tuning and setup stability.

The second advantage of quartersawn wood is the decorative pattern on the board, although this depends on the timber species.  Flat sawn wood (especially oak) will often display a prominent wavy grain (sometimes called a cathedral-window pattern) caused by the saw cutting at a tangent to a growth ring; since in quartersawn wood the saw cuts across the growth rings, the visible grain is much straighter; it is this evenness of the grain that gives quartersawn wood its greater stability.

In addition to the grain, quartersawn wood (particularly oak) will also often display a pattern of medullary rays, seen as subtle wavy ribbon-like patterns across the straight grain. Medullary rays grow in a radial fashion in the living tree, so while flat-sawing would cut across the rays, quarter-sawing puts them on the face of the board. This ray pattern has made quartersawn wood especially desirable for furniture and decorative panelling.

Quartersawn oak was a key feature of the decorative style of the American Arts and Crafts movement, particularly the work of Gustav Stickley, who said "The quartersawing method of cutting... renders quartersawn oak structurally stronger, also finer in grain, and, as shown before, less liable to warp and check than when sawn in any other way."  Cheaper  copies of Stickley's furniture were sometimes made with the less-expensive ash stained to resemble oak, but it can be identified by its lack of rays.

Wood cut in this way is prized for certain applications, but it will tend to be more expensive as well. In cutting a log, quarter sawn boards can be produced in several ways, but if a log is cut for maximum yield  it will produce only a few quarter sawn boards among the total; if a log is cut to produce only quarter sawn boards there will be considerable waste.

The process indicated in the US as "quarter sawing" yields a few boards that are quartersawn, but mostly rift sawn boards.

See also
 Wood grain

References

Further reading

External links 
 

Woodworking